Kolos Stadium is a multifunctional facility, primarily used for football and field hockey located in Boryspil, Kyiv Oblast, Ukraine. Currently the Ukrainian Premier League football club Arsenal Kyiv plays their home games at the stadium.

History
The stadium was initially constructed after the Second World War and had a capacity for 7,500 spectators. In 1997 the facility was reconstructed and modernized with individual seating as well change rooms, a special medical room and massage facilities and new parking arena.

The capacity was reduced to 5,654 with approximately 2,000 covered seats.

The hockey facility has a separate arena which is uses a synthetic turf and a small covered stadium with a capacity for 1,500 spectators.

Football usage
From the start of the Ukrainian Premier League 2009–10 season Arsenal Kyiv plays their home games at the stadium. Borysfen Boryspil also used the stadium as their home ground until the club folded in 2007. Other clubs to have used this facility include: Knyazha Schaslyve, CSCA Kyiv and their reserve team, FC Dynamo-2 Kyiv, FC Dynamo-3 Kyiv. The stadium also hosted playoff games for promotion to the Ukrainian First League 1998-99 between Prykarpattia Ivano-Frankivsk and Cherkasy as well as women's, youth and junior internationals. The record attendance for a game is 6,500 when Borysfen Boryspil hosted Dynamo Kyiv on April 9, 2005.

Gallery

References

External links 
  Stadiums in Ukraine

1950s establishments in Ukraine
Football venues in Ukraine
Sports venues in Kyiv Oblast
Sport in Boryspil
Field hockey in Ukraine
Field hockey venues